Chekhov's gun (Chekhov's rifle) is a narrative principle that states that every element in a story must be necessary, and irrelevant elements should be removed. For example, if a writer features a gun in a story, there must be a reason for it, such as it being fired sometime later in the plot. All elements must eventually come into play at some point in the story. Some authors, such as Hemingway, do not agree with this principle.

Background
The principle is recorded in letters by Anton Chekhov several times, with some variation; it was advice for young playwrights.

Ernest Hemingway mocked the principle in his essay "The art of the short story", giving the example of two characters that are introduced and then never mentioned again in his short story "Fifty Grand". Hemingway valued inconsequential details, but conceded that readers will inevitably seek symbolism and significance in them. Writer Andrea Phillips noted that assigning a single role for every detail makes a story predictable and leaves it "colorless".

Writing in 1999, Donald Rayfield noted that in Chekhov's play The Cherry Orchard, contrary to Chekhov's own advice, there are two loaded firearms that are not fired. The unfired rifles tie into the play's theme of lacking or incomplete action.

Variations
Ernest J. Simmons, (1903–1972) writes that Chekhov repeated the same point, which may account for there being several variations.

 "One must never place a loaded rifle on the stage if it isn't going to go off. It's wrong to make promises you don't mean to keep."
 "Remove everything that has no relevance to the story. If you say in the first act that there is a rifle hanging on the wall, in the second or third act it absolutely must go off. If it's not going to be fired, it shouldn't be hanging there." — Sergius Shchukin (1911) Memoirs.
 "If in the first act you have hung a pistol on the wall, then in the following one it should be fired. Otherwise don't put it there."

Examples
The principle is carried out somewhat literally in many of the James Bond films, in which the spy is presented with new gadgets at the beginning of a mission – such as a concealed, wrist-activated dart gun – and typically each device serves a vital role in the story.

See also
 Concision – the principle of brevity in writing
 Foreshadowing – a plot device where what is to come is hinted at, to arouse interest or to guard against disappointment
 MacGuffin – a plot motivator that is necessary to the plot and the motivation of the characters, but insignificant, unimportant, or irrelevant in itself
 Occam's razor – the idea that explanatory mechanisms should not be posited without being necessary. 
 Red herring – drawing attention to a certain element to mislead
 Shaggy dog story – a long-winded anecdote designed to lure the audience into a false sense of expectation, only to disappoint them with an anticlimactic ending or punchline.

References

Narrative techniques
Gun
Metaphors referring to war and violence
Plot (narrative)
19th-century introductions
Gun violence in fiction